Shobhabazar Sutanuti is a station of the Kolkata Metro. It is located near Shobhabazar.

History

Construction

The station

Structure
Shobhabazar Sutanuti  is underground metro station, situated on the Kolkata Metro Line 1 of Kolkata Metro.

Station layout

Connections

Bus
Bus route number 3B, 30C, 43, 47B, 78, 211, 211A, 211B, 214, 214A, 215/1, 215A, 219/1, 222, 242, 5 (Mini), 7 (Mini), S139 (Mini), S159 (Mini), S160 (Mini), S161 (Mini), S163 (Mini), S164 (Mini), S166/1 (Mini), S168 (Mini), S175 (Mini), S176 (Mini), S180 (Mini), S181 (Mini), S189 (Mini), C28, E32, S9A, S10, S11, S15G, S17A, S32, S32A, S57, AC20, AC40, AC54 etc. serve the station.

Train
Sovabazar Ahiritola railway station is the nearest rail station. Bidhannagar Road railway station is also located nearby.

Auto
Ahiritola to Ultadanga via Shobhabazar Sutanuti Metro Station and B.K.Paul to Cossipore 4B Bus stand via Baghbazar

Entry/Exit

Gallery

See also

Kolkata
List of Kolkata Metro stations
Transport in Kolkata
Kolkata Metro Rail Corporation
Kolkata Suburban Railway
Kolkata Monorail
Trams in Kolkata
Shobhabazar
List of rapid transit systems
List of metro systems

References

External links
 
 Official Website for line 1
 UrbanRail.Net – descriptions of all metro systems in the world, each with a schematic map showing all stations.

Kolkata Metro stations
Railway stations in Kolkata